An equated monthly installment (EMI) is defined by Investopedia as "A fixed payment amount made by a borrower to a lender at a specified date each calendar month. Equated monthly installments are used to pay off both interest and principal each month, so that over a specified number of years, the loan is fully paid off along with interest."

It further explains that, with most common types of loans, such as real estate mortgages, the borrower makes fixed periodic payments to the lender over the course of several years with the goal of retiring the loan. EMIs differ from variable payment plans, in which the borrower is able to pay higher payment amounts at his or her discretion. In EMI plans, borrowers are mostly only allowed one fixed payment amount each month.

The benefit of an EMI for borrowers is that they know precisely how much money they will need to pay toward their loan each month, making the personal budgeting process easier.

The formula for EMI (in arrears) is:
      

or, equivalently,

where: P is the principal amount borrowed,  A is the periodic amortization payment, r is the annual interest rate divided by 100 (annual interest rate also divided by 12 in case of monthly installments), and n is the total number of payments (for a 30-year loan with monthly payments n = 30 × 12 = 360).

For example, if you borrow 10,000,000 units of a currency from the bank at 10.5% annual interest for a period of 10 years (i.e., 120 months), then EMI = units of currency 10,000,000 × 0.00875 × (1 + 0.00875)120/((1 + 0.00875)120 – 1) = units of currency 134,935. i.e., you will have to pay total currency units 134,935 for 120 months to repay the entire loan amount. The total amount payable will be  134,935 × 120 = 16,192,200 currency units that includes currency units 6,192,200 as interest toward the loan.

Second formula for EMI 

EMI = [P x R x (1+R)^N]/[(1+R)^N-1]

Where,

P = Loan amount

R = Interest rate per month (annual rate divided by 12)

N = Number of monthly installments

For example, suppose you take out a loan of $100,000 at an interest rate of 10% per annum for a tenure of 5 years (60 months). Using the above formula, the EMI would be:

EMI = [100000 x 0.00833 x (1+0.00833)^60]/[(1+0.00833)^60-1]

= $2,124.08

References

Credit
Loans